Navicula alea is a species of algae in the genus Navicula which occurs in North American rivers.

References

adamata
Species described in 1963